Sunwing Airlines Inc. is a Canadian low-cost airline headquartered in Toronto, Ontario.

Sunwing Airlines offers scheduled and charter services from Canada and the United States to destinations within the United States, Mexico, the Caribbean, Central America, and South America in the winter months. During the summer months, the company offers domestic services across Canada. It is a subsidiary of Sunwing Travel Group and its main Canadian bases are Montréal-Pierre Elliott Trudeau International Airport, Toronto Pearson International Airport, and Vancouver International Airport. The company also operates seasonal flight services from approximately 25 local Canadian gateways including Calgary International Airport, Edmonton International Airport, Halifax Stanfield International Airport, Ottawa Macdonald–Cartier International Airport, Québec City Jean Lesage International Airport, and Winnipeg James Armstrong Richardson International Airport.

History

By 2004, Sunwing Vacations had become the second largest tour operator in the Ontario area. That year, a former Skyservice employee named Mark Williams approached the CEO of Sunwing Travel Group, Colin Hunter, and asked if he wanted to start an airline. A few weeks later official plans to launch the airline were in place. In November 2005, a Boeing 737-800 departing from Toronto to Santiago de Cuba was the airline's inaugural flight. In December 2005, Sunwing flew its first direct flight from Sudbury, Ontario to Varadero, Cuba, making it one of the first international flights directly from the Sudbury Airport. In November 2006, the company flew its first flight out of Montreal.

By 2008, Sunwing Airlines had grown to operate in 29 cities.

In 2015, it was announced that Sunwing had finalized a $350 million deal to acquire two Boeing 737-800 and four Boeing 737 MAX 8 aircraft from Air Lease Corporation. The aircraft are due to be delivered over a four-year period from early 2016. Seneca College and the University of Waterloo launched a partnership with Sunwing in 2016 to form a cadet program which includes flight training and mentoring through Sunwing. Sunwing joined the Transportation Security Administration's (TSA) expedited screening program, TSA PreCheck, in January 2017. At that time, the TSA PreCheck program was available at 180 United States airports and works with 30 airlines.

Sunwing took delivery of their first Boeing 737 MAX 8 on May 25, 2018.

In March 2023, the Canadian’s transportation minister approved the takeover of Sunwing Airlines by WestJet Group.

Destinations

Sunwing Airlines flies to a wide range of vacation destinations across the Caribbean, Mexico, Cuba, Central, and South America. The most popular destinations include Varadero, Punta Cana, Cancun, and Montego Bay. Its parent company, the Sunwing Travel Group, is Cuba's largest travel provider internationally, sending over 700,000 vacationers to the destination each year.

In Canada, the airline operates several domestic routes, including Toronto to Vancouver which operated daily as of Summer 2015, as well as maintaining year-round service to its most popular destinations. Other connections include Deer Lake, Gander, and St John's from Toronto. As of Summer 2015, the airline operated service to Caribbean destinations from Atlanta, Baltimore, Charlotte, Cincinnati, Columbus, Houston, Lansing, Milwaukee, Nashville, New Orleans, Newark, Philadelphia, Pittsburgh, and Rockford.

In summer, Sunwing Airlines sends many of their 737-800 aircraft over to Europe to operate for the TUI Group during their extremely busy season. The aircraft operate flights all around Europe for the company. The deal is reciprocated during the winter months with Tui sending several aircraft to Canada to operate Sunwing routes. 

Sunwing has an agreement with ULCC Swoop that allows passengers out of Hamilton, London, Edmonton, Abbotsford, and Winnipeg to book Sunwing vacation packages with Swoop flights.

In-flight services

In the past Sunwing offered meals on longer flights, but the current menu (2023) offers light snacks and refreshments from a pay-as-you-go menu.

Fleet

Current fleet
The Sunwing Airlines fleet consists of the following aircraft :

Former fleet

Accidents and incidents
On July 25, 2014, a Sunwing Airlines Boeing 737-800, Flight 772 from Toronto Pearson International Airport to Scarlett Martínez International Airport was forced to return to Toronto after a passenger made a bomb threat. The plane was escorted by a United States Air Force plane and it landed safely. The passenger was arrested and was said to be mentally ill after being examined by medical personnel. The same flight was delayed again after a passenger fainted.
On January 5, 2018, a Sunwing Airlines Boeing 737-800 (registration C-FPRP), which was being taxied with no passengers, struck WestJet Flight 2425, a Boeing 737-800 (registration C-FDMB) flight from Cancún International Airport to Toronto Pearson International Airport, while parked and on approach to the gate. Fire crews put out a small fire on the Sunwing aircraft.
On December 30, 2021, a Sunwing Airlines Boeing 737-800 (registration C-FYJD), was operating Sunwing Airlines Flight 2283, a charter flight from Montréal–Trudeau International Airport to Cancún International Airport. On board the flight a group of influencers started to become unruly on board the flight and began to consume their own alcohol, use electronic cigarettes, with other passengers alleging that drugs were being consumed on the aircraft as well, non-compliance of orders from Transport Canada surrounding mask-wearing due to the COVID-19 pandemic in Canada. In the aftermath of this event, Sunwing canceled the charter flight back to Montreal with other Canadian airlines, Air Transat and Flag Carrier Air Canada stating that passengers who were on Flight 2283 would be denied boarding. Prime Minister of Canada Justin Trudeau said that Flight 2283 was, "a slap in the face to see people putting themselves, putting their fellow citizens, putting airline workers at risk by being completely irresponsible". Federal Minister of Transport, Omar Alghabra and Minister of Public Safety, Marco Mendicino released a joint statement and directing both of their respective departments to investigate the events of Flight 2283.

References

External links

Air Transport Association of Canada
Low-cost carriers
Airlines established in 2005
Charter airlines of Canada
Companies based in Etobicoke
2005 establishments in Ontario
Canadian companies established in 2005
TUI Group